Our Lady of Guadalupe Church may refer to:
 in Mexico
 Church of Our Lady of Guadalupe (Puerto Vallarta), Jalisco

 in the United States

Our Lady of Guadalupe Catholic Church (Guadalupe, Arizona)
Our Lady of Guadalupe Church (San Francisco, California)
Our Lady of Guadalupe Church (Conejos, Colorado) (or Antonito, Colorado), listed on the National Register of Historic Places (NRHP) in Conejos County
Our Lady of Guadalupe Church (Denver, Colorado), a Denver Landmark
Our Lady of Guadalupe Chapel (New Orleans), Louisiana
Our Lady of Guadalupe Parish (Taos, New Mexico)
Our Lady of Guadalupe Church (New York City), New York
Our Lady of Guadalupe Catholic Church (Houston), Texas
Catedral Nuestra Señora de Guadalupe of Ponce, in Ponce, Puerto Rico, NRHP-listed

See also
Cathedral of Our Lady of Guadalupe (disambiguation)